Burlakov is a Russian surname. Notable people include:
Edgars Burlakovs (born 1974), Latvian former footballer
Oleg Burlakov (1945-2021), Russian businesspeople
Pavlo Burlakov (born 1963), Ukrainian politician
Ruslan Burlakov, Ukrainian paralympic swimmer
Sergey Burlakov (born 1971), Russian paralympic athlete and politician
Vladimir Burlakov (born 1987), Russian-born German actor
Yuriy Burlakov (born 1960), Soviet/Russian former cross-country skier

Russian-language surnames